The Alaska red-tailed hawk (Buteo jamaicensis alascensis) is a subspecies of red-tailed hawk that breeds (and is probably resident) from southeastern coastal Alaska to the Queen Charlotte Islands and Vancouver Island in British Columbia. Despite its northerly distribution, this is the second smallest of the red-tailed hawks. Only the Jamaican red-tailed hawk (B. j. jamaicensis) is smaller.

The largest females from this race are smaller than almost all male red tails from other races in Canada. This race is darker than the pale morph of the western red-tailed hawk (B. j. calurus), nearly solidly dark brown above with almost no pale mottling on the scapulars. The breast is slightly rufous with dark arrowheads rather than streaking around the belly (although not all B. j. alascensis have the arrowheads, probably through hybridization with other races), meanwhile the rest of the underside down to the "trousers" is paler and more washed out than on B. j. calurus. Immatures of this race are usually blackish brown overall with a white throat and wide tail bands, rather unlike B. j. calurus.

References 

Alaska red-tailed hawk